In distributed computing, failure semantics is used  to describe and classify errors that distributed systems can experience.

Types of errors
A list of types of errors that can occur:
 An omission error is when one or more responses fails.
 A crash error is when nothing happens. A crash is a special case of omission when all responses fail.
 A Timing error is when one or more responses arrive outside the time interval specified. Timing errors can be early or late. An omission error is a timing error when a response has infinite timing error.
 An arbitrary error is any error, (i.e. a wrong value or a timing error).
 When a client uses a server it can cope with different type errors from the server.
 If it can manage a crash at the server it is said to assume the server to have crash failure semantics.
 If it can manage a service omission it is said to assume the server to have omission failure semantics.
 Failure semantics are the type of errors that are expected to appear.
 Should another type of error appear it will lead to a service failure because it cannot be managed.

References

Failure
Distributed computing problems